This historical list of the ten largest countries by GDP according to the World Bank shows how the membership and rankings of the world's ten largest economies has changed. Historically, the United States was consistently year after year the world's largest economy since the early twentieth century. However, the report from 2014 showed that for the very first time China overtook the United States as the largest economy in the world taking into account purchasing power parity (PPP). Indeed, the margin of power between nations had generally widened and then lessened over time, and over the last fifty years the world has seen the rapid rise and fall in relative terms of the economies of other countries.

World Bank statistics of the ten largest economies by GDP (PPP)

References 

Lists of countries by GDP
International Monetary Fund
Economy-related lists of superlatives